Tropical Park is a  urban park in metropolitan Miami, Florida. The park is located just southwest of the intersection of the Palmetto Expressway (SR 826)  and Bird Road, just west of South Miami.

History 
The land opened as a county public park in 1979, on the grounds of the former Tropical Park Race Track, which had used the lands since 1931.

Facilities
It has a boxing center, fields for football, soccer and softball, as well as facilities to play basketball, volleyball and racquetball. Tropical Park has a tennis center with 12 tennis courts that are wheelchair-accessible. There are four lakes within the park, a  dog park, as well as paddle-boating, and freshwater fishing. Cyclists, joggers, and runners use the miles of paved pathways circulating through park.

Equestrian Center
Throughout the year, the park hosts horse shows, rodeos, and other special events at the Tropical Park Equestrian Center. The equestrian center hosts over 30 horse shows a year, including international shows. The old racetrack's stables were used as part of the equestrian center.

Stadium
The Tropical Park Stadium is home to the Miami-Dade Track and Field Team. It has also hosted prestigious national track and field meets such as the Junior Olympics, USA National Track and Field Championships, and many local high school football games.

Santa's Enchanted Forest
Annually, from early November through the beginning of January, Santa's Enchanted Forest took over a large part of Tropical Park until 2019. The holiday event featured six million lights, a giant Christmas tree, and carnival rides.

References 

Parks in Miami-Dade County, Florida
1979 establishments in Florida